Irina Rozovsky (born 1981) is a Russian-born American photographer.

Life and work
Rozovsky was born in Moscow. She studied at Massachusetts College of Art and Design  in Boston, Massachusetts.

Island on my Mind was the winner of the Dummy Award for best unpublished photo book, at the 2014 Kassel Photo Book Festival.

Books
One to Nothing. Consortium, 2011. With a foreword by Ilya Kaminsky and an introduction by Jon Feinstein. .
Island on my Mind. Kettler, 2015. .
In Plain Air. London: Mack, 2021. .

References

1981 births
Living people
Artists from Boston
21st-century American women photographers
21st-century American photographers
21st-century American women